Russell Frederick Cook (born 23 September 1947) is a former Australian rules footballer who played with South Melbourne in the VFL. He won the Bob Skilton Medal in 1972.

He also played cricket for Victoria and in seven first-class games took 16 wickets as a left-arm fast-medium pace bowler.

See also
 List of Victoria first-class cricketers

External links

Cricinfo profile

1947 births
Sydney Swans players
Bob Skilton Medal winners
Australian cricketers
Victoria cricketers
Living people
Australian rules footballers from Melbourne
Cricketers from Melbourne
People from South Melbourne